Electric Loco Shed, Vadodara is an electric engine shed located in Vadodara, in the Indian state of Gujarat. It is located to south of Vadodara railway station, it falls under the Vadodara railway division of Western Railway. It is the largest of locomotive sheds in the Western Railway zone.

History 
It was established in the 1970s specifically to home dual-power locos. It holds more than 50 WAG-5 class locomotives.

It was an AC electric trip shed to house locos coming from other sheds and an AC/DC dual loco trip shed which houses WCAM class locomotives from Valsad shed and which allows locomotive changes at Vadodara because the trains which were coming from New Delhi mainline are AC Locomotives and the trains going to Mumbai need AC/DC Loco.

Post AC conversion of Western Railway, WCAM-1 & WCAM-2/2P fleet transferred to Central Railway's Kalyan Loco Shed. WCAM-1 was gradually condemned and are out of service totally.

Livery & markings 
BRC WAP-5 & WAP-7 has two brand advertisement, one is Amul Milk and second is Fortune Edible Oils & Chakki Fresh Atta. It is painted on loco's body side.
BRC loco shed has its own stencils. It is written in Hindi and English language on loco's front side, rear side and lower bodyside.

Locomotives

References

External links 
 Railway Board - Official Website
 Western Railway - Official Website

Vadodara
Vadodara
Vadodara Electric Loco Shed
Vadodara
Transport in Vadodara
1970 establishments in Gujarat